The 1998 Qatar Crown Prince Cup was the 4th edition of this cup tournament in men's football (soccer). It was played by the top 4 teams of the Q-League.

Al-Sadd were crowned champions for the first time.

Results

Qatar Crown Prince Cup
Cup